Maria Kirilenko was the defending champion, but she was defeated in the final by Roberta Vinci, 6–0, 6–4.

Seeds

Draw

Finals

Top half

Bottom half

External links
Main Draw
Qualifying Draw

Singles